Christianne Mwasesa Mwange (born 23 March 1985) is a Congolese handball player for Primeiro de Agosto and the DR Congo national team.

She competed at the 2013 World Women's Handball Championship in Serbia, where DR Congo placed 20th, and Mwasesa was top scorer for the Congolese team.

References

External links

1985 births
African Games bronze medalists for DR Congo
African Games medalists in handball
Living people
People from Lubumbashi
Democratic Republic of the Congo female handball players
Expatriate handball players
Democratic Republic of the Congo expatriates in Angola
Democratic Republic of the Congo expatriates in France
Competitors at the 2019 African Games
21st-century Democratic Republic of the Congo people